Chay Weng Yew (22 February 1928 – 27 August 2004) was a Singaporean weightlifter. He competed in the men's featherweight event at the 1952 Summer Olympics.

References

External links
 
 

1928 births
2004 deaths
Singaporean male weightlifters
Olympic weightlifters of Singapore
Weightlifters at the 1952 Summer Olympics
Place of birth missing
Asian Games medalists in weightlifting
Weightlifters at the 1951 Asian Games
Weightlifters at the 1954 Asian Games
Medalists at the 1954 Asian Games
Asian Games bronze medalists for Singapore
20th-century Singaporean people